San Cosme is a station on Line 2 of the Mexico City Metro system. It is located in the Cuauhtémoc municipality of Mexico City, northwest of the city centre, on Avenue Ribera de San Cosme a few blocks before it becomes Calzada México-Tacuba. The southern exit leads to Colonia San Rafael while the Northern one leads to Colonia Santa María la Ribera. It is two blocks from the Mercado de San Cosme. In 2019, the station had an average ridership of 22,891 passengers per day.

Name and pictogram
The station name comes from the Ribera de San Cosme avenue, on which the station is located. The former name of the road was Calzada de San Cosme and a stream used to run along the way before the desiccation of Lake Texcoco, hence the name "ribera".

The station pictogram depicts a balcony from the nearby colonial building known as La Casa de los Mascarones that currently houses the National Autonomous University of Mexico Foreign Languages School.

General information
The station was opened on 14 September 1970 as part of the second stretch of Line 2, from Pino Suárez to Tacuba.

The station serves the Colonia San Rafael and Colonia Santa María la Ribera neighborhoods.

Ridership

Exits
North: Avenida Ribera de San Cosme and Rosas Moreno street, Colonia San Rafael
South: Avenida Ribera de San Cosme and Naranjo street, Colonia Santa María la Ribera

Gallery

See also 
 List of Mexico City metro stations

References

External links 

San Cosme
Railway stations opened in 1970
1970 establishments in Mexico
Mexico City Metro stations in Cuauhtémoc, Mexico City
Mexico City Metro stations in Miguel Hidalgo, Mexico City